Alexandru Petrică Pătlăgică (born 28 March 2003) is a Romanian professional footballer who plays as a right back for Metaloglobus București, on loan from UTA Arad.

Club career

UTA Arad

He made his Liga I debut for UTA Arad against Sepsi OSK on 05 February 2022.

References

External links
 
 

2003 births
Living people
Sportspeople from Hunedoara
Romanian footballers
Romania youth international footballers
Association football defenders
Liga I players
Liga II players
Liga III players
FC UTA Arad players
AFC Dacia Unirea Brăila players
FC Metaloglobus București players